Tomas Engström (born 18 January 1964) is a Swedish auto racing driver. He is married with four children. In the 1990s he dominated the Swedish Camaro Cup, winning five back-to-back titles between 1994 and 1998. Since then he has mainly competed in touring cars, driving in the Swedish Touring Car Championship since 1999, when he entered an independent Chrysler Stratus. After this he managed and drove for the Honda Racing Team in a Honda Accord, with his best season for the team coming in 2003, when he finished third overall. Also in 2003, he competed in four rounds of the European Touring Car Championship. In 2007, he was runner up in the S2000 Class of the European Touring Car Cup.

In 2007, he entered two rounds of the FIA World Touring Car Championship at Monza, finishing as top independent in race one.

In 2008 he finished eighth in the STCC, driving alongside third place Thed Björk. He will continue to drive for Engström Motorsport Honda, in the 2009 STCC season.

Racing record

Complete World Touring Car Championship results
(key) (Races in bold indicate pole position) (Races in italics indicate fastest lap)

Complete TCR International Series results
(key) (Races in bold indicate pole position) (Races in italics indicate fastest lap)

References

1964 births
Living people
Swedish racing drivers
Swedish Touring Car Championship drivers
World Touring Car Championship drivers
European Touring Car Championship drivers
European Touring Car Cup drivers
TCR International Series drivers
Engstler Motorsport drivers